Giovanni Vecchina (16 August 1902 – 5 April 1973) was an Italian football player and manager from Venice in the region of Veneto. A forward, Vecchina played his entire career in the Italian football system; he is best known for his time with Juventus, Venezia and Padova. At international level, he represented the Italy national football team twice in 1928.

After retiring from playing, Vecchia went on to manage Italian football clubs including Napoli with Attila Sallustro.

References

External links

Italian footballers
Italy international footballers
Serie A players
Venezia F.C. players
Calcio Padova players
Juventus F.C. players
Torino F.C. players
A.S. Siracusa players
S.S.C. Napoli managers
1902 births
1973 deaths
Association football forwards
Italian football managers
A.S.D. La Biellese players